The Notorious Sophie Lang is a 1934 American crime drama film directed by Ralph Murphy and starring Gertrude Michael, Paul Cavanagh and Alison Skipworth.

The title character is a beautiful international jewel thief. As she returns to the United States after five years in Britain, detectives set a trap. The Notorious Sophie Lang is the first of three Sophie Lang pictures with Gertrude Michael, each with a different director. The others are The Return of Sophie Lang (1936), and Sophie Lang Goes West (1937).

Plot

Cast
 Gertrude Michael as Sophie Lang
 Paul Cavanagh as Max Bernard/Sir Nigel Crane
 Arthur Byron as Inspector Stone
 Alison Skipworth as Aunt Nellie
 Leon Errol as Stubbs
 Ben Taggart as Captain Thompson
 Ferdinand Gottschalk as Augustus Telfen
 Dell Henderson as House Detective
 Jack Mulhall as Jewelry Clerk

References

External links
 

1934 films
Films directed by Ralph Murphy
Paramount Pictures films
American crime drama films
1934 crime drama films
American black-and-white films
1930s American films
1930s English-language films